In enzymology, a 16-hydroxysteroid epimerase is an enzyme that catalyzes the chemical reaction

16alpha-hydroxysteroid  16beta-hydroxysteroid

Hence, this enzyme has one substrate, 16alpha-hydroxysteroid, and one product, 16beta-hydroxysteroid.

This enzyme belongs to the family of isomerases, specifically those racemases and epimerases acting on other compounds.  The systematic name of this enzyme class is 16-hydroxysteroid 16-epimerase.

References

 

EC 5.1.99
Enzymes of unknown structure